Joram Mgeveke (born 5 August 1992) is a Tanzanian football defender who plays for Mwadui United.

References

1992 births
Living people
Tanzanian footballers
Tanzania international footballers
Lipuli F.C. players
Simba S.C. players
Mwadui United F.C. players
Association football defenders
Tanzanian Premier League players